Hanis may refer to:
Hanis people
Hanis language
Hanis, Iran